The Airdrome Fokker D-VI is an American amateur-built aircraft, designed and produced by Airdrome Aeroplanes, of Holden, Missouri. The aircraft is supplied as a kit for amateur construction.

The aircraft is a 3/4 scale replica of the First World War German Fokker D.VI fighter, built from modern materials and powered by modern engines.

Design and development
The Airdrome Fokker D-VI features a strut-braced biplane layout, a single-seat open cockpit, fixed conventional landing gear and a single engine in tractor configuration.

The aircraft is made from bolted-together aluminum tubing, with its flying surfaces covered in doped aircraft fabric. The kit is made up of twelve sub-kits. The standard engine is the  Rotax 503 two stroke engine, with a Volkswagen air-cooled engine optional. Building time from the factory-supplied kit is estimated at 400 hours by the manufacturer.

Operational history
Fourteen examples had been completed by December 2011.

Specifications (Fokker D-VI)

References

Homebuilt aircraft
Single-engined tractor aircraft